Perimeter Aviation is an airline with its head office on the property of Winnipeg James Armstrong Richardson International Airport in Winnipeg, Manitoba, Canada. Perimeter Aviation operates more than 30 aircraft on scheduled, charter, and medevac service. It was established and started operations in 1960. It operates scheduled passenger services from Winnipeg to 23 destinations, freight and MEDEVAC services. Its main base is Winnipeg International Airport.

Perimeter is the largest carrier in Manitoba, in terms of number of aircraft and number of flights.

Destinations
As of January 2017, Perimeter provides scheduled passenger service to the following destinations:
Manitoba
Brochet (Brochet Airport)
Cross Lake (Cross Lake (Charlie Sinclair Memorial) Airport)
Gods Lake Narrows (Gods Lake Narrows Airport)
Island Lake/Garden Hill First Nation (Island Lake Airport)
Lac Brochet (Lac Brochet Airport)
Manto Sipi Cree Nation (Gods River) (Gods River Airport)
Norway House (Norway House Airport)
Oxford House (Oxford House Airport)
Red Sucker Lake (Red Sucker Lake Airport)
St. Theresa Point First Nation/Wasagamack (St. Theresa Point Airport)
Shamattawa First Nation (Shamattawa Airport)
South Indian Lake (South Indian Lake Airport)
Tadoule Lake (Tadoule Lake Airport)
Thompson (Thompson Airport) hub
Winnipeg (Winnipeg James Armstrong Richardson International Airport) hub
York Factory First Nation (York Landing Airport)
Ontario
Deer Lake First Nation (Deer Lake Airport)
North Caribou Lake First Nation or Weagamow First Nation (Round Lake (Weagamow Lake) Airport)
North Spirit Lake First Nation (North Spirit Lake Airport)
Pikangikum First Nation (Pikangikum Airport)
Sachigo Lake First Nation (Sachigo Lake Airport)
Sandy Lake First Nation (Sandy Lake Airport)
Poplar Hill First Nation (Poplar Hill Airport)
Sioux Lookout (Sioux Lookout Airport) hub

Fleet
As of July 2021 there were 44 aircraft registered to Perimeter Aviation with Transport Canada and the company says they have more than 30 aircraft:

Perimeter operates more than 30 aircraft on scheduled, charter, and MEDEVAC service with all aircraft having two engines for safety reasons. These include 10 Metros variants, and 5 Dash-8's. The Metros can be quickly configured from straight freighter configuration to a 19-seat commuter interior. The Dash-8s can be configured to 37 seats, 29 seats, 21 seats, for the 100 series or 45 and 50 seat configuration for the 300 series.

Accidents and incidents 
Perimeter Airlines has had five reported accidents.  
1 November 1996, a Swearingen SA.226TC Metro II aircraft was on a scheduled flight (PAG207) to Gods River (ZGI) from Gods Lake Narrows (YGO). After travelling about  they hit a ridge of snow. The left gear touched down about  ahead of the threshold and the aircraft went off the right side of the runway. The aircraft had two pilots and five passengers on board and there were no fatalities or injuries but the aircraft was a write-off.
11 or 12 October 2001, a Swearingen SA.226TC Metro II Perimeter Flight 962 arrived at Shamattawa on a MEDIVAC flight to pick up a patient. It was night and the aircraft was coming into runway 01 too fast and too high so the crew performed a missed approach. Flying to the left of the runway centreline the aircraft hit some trees and came to rest in some muskeg. There were three people on board, both pilots were killed and the third person required hospitalization.
8 November 2006, a Swearingen SA.226TC Metro II was touching down at Norway House. The crew selected propeller reverse and the aircraft turned to the left with the main tire making contact with some loose snow. The aircraft next went over a ditch and climbed an embankment where the landing gear collapsed. The seven passengers and two crew evacuated the plane safely but it was a write-off.
 On 23 December 2012, a Swearingen SA227-AC Metro III passenger plane with nine people aboard, operated by Perimeter on behalf of Kivalliq Air crashed at Sanikiluaq Airport (YSK) in Sanikiluaq, Nunavut, killing an infant boy and injuring all the others. The aircraft was on a second approach at the time.

References

External links

Regional airlines of Manitoba
Airlines established in 1960
Companies based in Winnipeg